Brontes may refer to:
 Brontes, one of the Cyclopes of Greek mythology, whose name means 'thunder'
Bronte, a minor Greek goddess associated with thunder
 Bronte, Sicily, town near Catania (Sicily); legacy of Brontes cyclops
 Brontë, family; notably:
 Charlotte Brontë (1816–1855), English novelist and poet, the eldest of the three
 Emily Brontë (1818–1848), English novelist and poet who is best known for her only novel, Wuthering Heights
 Anne Brontë (1820–1849), English novelist and poet, the youngest member
 Brontes Technologies was a Lexington, MA startup company acquired in 2006 by 3M ESPE, 3M's dental division
 Brontes, codename of the JBoss Application Server version 7.1.1.Final
Sky Brontes, a Czech paraglider design

See also 
 Bronte (disambiguation)

it:Bronte